Christiane Klumpp (now Wagner; born 22 November 1976 in Freudenstadt, West Germany) is a retired German rhythmic gymnast.

She competed for Germany in the rhythmic gymnastics all-around competition at the 1992 Summer Olympics in Barcelona, placing 10th overall. Later in the same year, in November, she was 8th in the individual all-around at the World Rhythmic Gymnastics Championships in Brussels.

References

External links 
 

1976 births
Living people
German rhythmic gymnasts
Gymnasts at the 1992 Summer Olympics
Olympic gymnasts of Germany
People from Freudenstadt
Sportspeople from Karlsruhe (region)